Louis-Amédée Humbert (23 June 1814, Metz - 6 February 1876) was a French republican politician. He was a member of the National Assembly in 1871. He belonged to the Opportunist Republican parliamentary group, Gauche républicaine.

References

1814 births
1876 deaths
Politicians from Metz
Opportunist Republicans
Members of the National Assembly (1871)